Charm Diamond Centres is the largest independently owned Canadian jewellry retailer and second-largest jewellry retailer in Canada. Its stores are primarily located within regional malls in Canadian provinces such as Ontario, Alberta, Manitoba, Saskatchewan, Nova Scotia, New Brunswick, Newfoundland and Labrador and Prince Edward Island.

Charm Diamond Centres uses the Kimberley Process to certify that their diamonds come from legitimate sources.

The business was founded in Nova Scotia by Richard Calder in 1972. The jewellry chain is still owned and operated by the Calder family. In 2007, Calder received the Entrepreneur of the Year Special Citation Award for Retailing Excellence in the Category of Business-to-Consumer Products & Services at the Ernst & Young Entrepreneur of the Year Awards.

Charm Diamond Centres has been chosen as one of Canada's 50 Best Managed Companies since 2007; in 2013 it received Platinum status.

In January 2017, the company acquired the brand rights to Ben Moss Jewelers which had gone into receivership in 2016, rehired many former staff members and reopened 2 stores in Winnipeg along with announcing its intention to open several other stores in the following months. Under the 3 brands, Charm Diamond Centres, Crescent Gold and Diamonds, and Ben Moss Jewellers they operate 82 stores in nine provinces. Recent estimates put their number of employees at 800 with 60 being located at their Head Office in Nova Scotia.

References

Companies based in Halifax, Nova Scotia
Dartmouth, Nova Scotia
Retail companies established in 1972
1972 establishments in Nova Scotia
Jewellery retailers of Canada